The following are the national records in athletics in Guyana maintained by its national athletics federation: Athletics Association of Guyana (AAG).

Outdoor

Key to tables:

h = hand timing

A = affected by altitude

OT = oversized track (> 200m in circumference)

NWI = no wind measurement

Men

Women

Indoor

Men

Women

Notes

References
General
World Athletics Statistic Handbook 2022: National Outdoor Records
World Athletics Statistic Handbook 2022: National Indoor Records
Specific

External links
AAG web site

Guyana
Records
Athletics